Pasi Saapunki (born 24 February 1968) was a Finnish nordic combined skier who competed from 1988 to 1992.  At the 1988 Winter Olympics in Calgary, he finished seventh in the 3 x 10 km team and 15th in the 15 km individual events. Saapunki  also finished seventh in the 3 x 10 km team event at the 1992 Winter Olympics in Albertville.

Sappunki also competed in the 3 x 10 team event at the 1991 FIS Nordic World Ski Championships in Val di Fiemme. His best World Cup finish was eighth in a 15 km individual event in Finland in 1990.

External links
 

Nordic combined skiers at the 1988 Winter Olympics
Nordic combined skiers at the 1992 Winter Olympics
Finnish male Nordic combined skiers
Olympic Nordic combined skiers of Finland
Living people
1968 births
20th-century Finnish people